The CSA Steaua București Athletics section was created in 1947 and is one of the most successful athletics teams in Romania.

Achievements

Notable athletes

 Dumitru Tălmaciu
 Victor Dumitrescu
 Ioan Söter
 Mihai Romică
 Constantin Aioanei
 Romeo Coveianu
 Zoltán Szabó
 Aurel Raica
 Sorin Ioan
 Iolanda Balaș
 Viorica Viscopoleanu
 Carol Corbu
 Natalia Andrei
 Anișoara Cușmir-Stanciu
 Florența Crăciunescu
 Ella Kovacs
  Galina Astafei
 Liliana Năstase
 George Boroi
 Monica Iagăr-Dinescu
 Cristina Nicolau
 Oana Pantelimon
 Bogdan Tudor
 Elena Iagăr-Buhăianu
 Ștefan Vasilache

Coaches

 Petre Gheorghe Zâmbreșteanu
 Andrei Nagy
 Silviu Dumitrescu
 Alexandru Bizim
 Nicolae Mărășescu
 Dan Serafim
 Ioan Sabău
 Constantin Dumitrescu
 Doru Crișan
 Constantin Nourescu
 Corina Barbu
 Constantin Mihail

References

External links
Club website 
Official CSA Steaua website  

athletics
Sports clubs established in 1947
Athletics (track and field) clubs